A shortcoming is a character flaw.

Shortcomings may also refer to:

 "Shortcomings", an episode of the television series Sex and the City
Shortcomings (comics), a graphic novel by Adrian Tomine